Evaeverson Lemos da Silva (born 16 June 1980), commonly known as Brandão, is a Brazilian former footballer who played as a striker.

He spent most of his professional career with Shakhtar Donetsk, appearing in 220 competitive matches and scoring 91 goals while winning seven major titles. He also played several years in France, notably with Marseille where he won the Ligue 1 in 2009–10 amongst other accolades.

Club career

Early years and Shakhtar
Born in São Paulo, Brandão only played with modest clubs in his country initially. In 2002, he signed with Ukrainian Premier League side FC Shakhtar Donetsk from Iraty Sport Club, going on to be an attacking mainstay over the course of the following seasons.

In a team filled with compatriots, Brandão scored a combined 39 goals in the three championships won by the club during that timeframe, notably topping the individual charts in the 2005–06 campaign at 15.

France
On 13 January 2009, Brandão left for France with Olympique de Marseille, netting eight times in 30 games in his first full season as they won the Ligue 1 trophy after an 18-year wait. He was loaned twice in his early stint to two teams in his homeland, Cruzeiro Esporte Clube and Grêmio Foot-Ball Porto Alegrense.

In January 2012, Brandão returned to L'OM, notably scoring in the 92nd minute of a 2–2 away draw against Inter Milan in the campaign's UEFA Champions League round-of-16 second leg, enabling his team to advance on the away goals rule and reach the quarter-finals of the competition for the first time since 1993. On 14 April he netted the game's only goal in the final of the Coupe de la Ligue, against Olympique Lyonnais in extra time.

Brandão was released in June 2012 along with Elinton Andrade, Djimi Traoré and Jean-Philippe Sabo and, two months later, signed with fellow league side AS Saint-Étienne on a two-year contract. On 20 April of the following year, again in the domestic league cup, he scored in the 1–0 victory over Stade Rennais F.C. to give his team their first piece of silverware since 1981.

In August 2014, Brandão joined SC Bastia also of the French top level after complicated negotiations between St-Étienne and Bastia, due to issues related to the transfer of Sylvain Marchal between the two clubs in July 2012. In the same month, after a league game against Paris Saint-Germain FC, he headbutted opposing player Thiago Motta and broke his nose, being provisionally suspended from 22 August pending a league disciplinary hearing and eventually receiving a six-month ban; on 27 November, he was jailed for one month for his attack in addition to receiving a €20,000 fine. 

Brandão made his return on 11 April 2015, appearing as a late substitute as Bastia lost 0–4 to the same opponents in the French League Cup final. In February 2016, his prison sentence was changed on appeal to a five-year suspended sentence.

Later career
On 17 July 2017, Super League Greece club Levadiakos F.C. agreed terms with 37-year-old Brandão, who signed a one-year contract for an undisclosed fee from Londrina Esporte Clube.

Personal life
Brandão successfully applied for French citizenship in May 2014.

Career statistics

Honours
Shakhtar
Vyshcha Liha: 2004–05, 2005–06, 2007–08
Ukrainian Cup: 2003–04, 2007–08
Ukrainian Super Cup: 2005, 2008

Marseille
Ligue 1: 2009–10
Coupe de la Ligue: 2009–10, 2010–11, 2011–12

Saint-Étienne
Coupe de la Ligue: 2012–13

References

External links

1980 births
Living people
Footballers from São Paulo
Brazilian footballers
Association football forwards
Campeonato Brasileiro Série A players
Campeonato Brasileiro Série B players
Adap Galo Maringá Football Club players
União Bandeirante Futebol Clube players
Iraty Sport Club players
Associação Desportiva São Caetano players
Cruzeiro Esporte Clube players
Grêmio Foot-Ball Porto Alegrense players
Londrina Esporte Clube players
Ukrainian Premier League players
Ukrainian First League players
FC Shakhtar Donetsk players
FC Shakhtar-2 Donetsk players
Ligue 1 players
Olympique de Marseille players
AS Saint-Étienne players
SC Bastia players
Super League Greece players
Levadiakos F.C. players
Brazilian expatriate footballers
Expatriate footballers in Ukraine
Expatriate footballers in France
Expatriate footballers in Greece
Brazilian expatriate sportspeople in Ukraine
Brazilian expatriate sportspeople in France
Brazilian expatriate sportspeople in Greece
Ukrainian Premier League top scorers